Círcol Catòlic de Badalona (in Spanish, Círculo Católico de Badalona) is a basketball club based in Badalona, Spain.

History
The club was founded in 1941 and competed in the third division until 1958, when it promotes to Segunda División. Círcol played ten seasons in this league before being relegated again to Tercera in 1970. In two years, the team achieved the promotion to the Liga Nacional.

The team remained in the Liga Nacional (in 1983 renamed Liga ACB) until 1986. Círcol always played in Badalona until 1984 when the club was relocated to Santa Coloma de Gramenet until it was relegated to 1ª División B.

Nowadays, the club continues competing in the Regional Divisions of Catalonia.

Sponsorship naming
CB Cotonificio 1976–1983
Licor 43 1983–1986

Season by season

Notable players
 Quim Costa
 Andrés Jiménez

Notable coaches
 Aíto García Reneses

External links
Official website
Profile at ACB.com

Catalan basketball teams
Sport in Badalona
Former Liga ACB teams